In software engineering, a double-chance function is a software design pattern with a strong application in cross-platform and scalable development.

Examples

Computer graphics

Consider a graphics API with functions to DrawPoint, DrawLine, and DrawSquare. It is easy to see that DrawLine can be implemented solely in terms of DrawPoint, and DrawSquare can in turn be implemented through four calls to DrawLine. If you were porting this API to a new architecture you would have a choice: implement three different functions natively (taking more time to implement, but likely resulting in faster code), or write DrawPoint natively, and implement the others as described above using common, cross-platform, code.  An important example of this approach is the X11 graphics system, which can be ported to new graphics hardware by providing a very small number of device-dependent primitives, leaving higher level functions to a hardware-independent layer.

The double-chance function is an optimal method of creating such an implementation, whereby the first draft of the port can use the "fast to market, slow to run" version with a common DrawPoint function, while later versions can be modified as "slow to market, fast to run". Where the double-chance pattern scores high is that the base API includes the self-supporting implementation given here as part of the null driver, and all other implementations are extensions of this. Consequently, the first port is, in fact, the first usable implementation.

One typical implementation in C++ could be:
 class CBaseGfxAPI {
     virtual void DrawPoint(int x, int y) = 0; /* Abstract concept for the null driver */
     virtual void DrawLine(int x1, int y1, int x2, int y2) { /* DrawPoint() repeated */}
     virtual void DrawSquare(int x1, int y1, int x2, int y2) { /* DrawLine() repeated */}
 };

 class COriginalGfxAPI : public CBaseGfxAPI {
     virtual void DrawPoint(int x, int y) { /* The only necessary native calls */ }
     virtual void DrawLine(int x1, int y1, int x2, int y2) { /* If this function exists a native DrawLine
                                                                routine will be used. Otherwise the base
                                                                implementation is run. */}
 };

 class CNewGfxAPI : public CBaseGfxAPI {
     virtual void DrawPoint(int x, int y) { /* The only necessary for native calls */ }
 };
Note that the CBaseGfxAPI::DrawPoint function is never used, per se, as any graphics call goes through one of its derived classes. So a call to CNewGfxAPI::DrawSquare would have its first chance to render a square by the CNewGfxAPI class. If no native implementation exists, then the base class is called, at which point the virtualization takes over and means that CNewGfxAPI::DrawLine is called. This gives the CNewGfxAPI class a “second chance” to use native code, if any is available.

With this method it is, theoretically, possible to build an entire 3D engine (applying software rasterizing) using only one native function in the form of DrawPoint, with other functions being implemented as and when time permits. In practice this would be hopelessly slow, but it does demonstrate the possibilities for double-chance functions.

References 

 

Software design patterns
Articles with example C++ code